The Communauté de communes of Seine-Austreberthe was located in the Seine-Maritime département in the Normandy region of northern France. It was created in January 1998. It was merged into the new Communauté d'agglomération Rouen-Elbeuf-Austreberthe in January 2010.

Participants 
The commune community comprised the following 14 communes:

Anneville-Ambourville
Bardouville
Berville-sur-Seine
Duclair
Épinay-sur-Duclair
Hénouville
Jumièges
Le Mesnil-sous-Jumièges
Quevillon
Sainte-Marguerite-sur-Duclair
Saint-Martin-de-Boscherville
Saint-Paër
Saint-Pierre-de-Varengeville
Yville-sur-Seine

See also
Communes of the Seine-Maritime department

References 

Seine-Austreberthe